Three ships of the Royal Navy have borne the name HMS St Jacob, after Saint Jacob:

  was a 4-gun fireship captured in 1666 and sold in 1667.
  was a 4-gun fireship purchased in 1667 and expended that same year.
  was a 6-gun dogger captured in 1672 and sold in 1674.

Royal Navy ship names